Sharjeel Ashraf (born 16 April 1982) is a Pakistani cricketer. He played in 15 first-class and 15 List A matches between 2000 and 2008. He made his Twenty20 debut on 25 April 2005, for Karachi Zebras in the 2004–05 National Twenty20 Cup.

References

External links
 

1982 births
Living people
Pakistani cricketers
Karachi cricketers
Karachi Dolphins cricketers
Karachi Zebras cricketers